Ghansawangi Assembly constituency is one of 288 assembly constituencies of Maharashtra state of India. It comes under Parbhani (Lok Sabha constituency) for Indian general elections.

The current member of the legislative assembly (MLA) from this constituency is Rajesh Tope (98,030 votes) of the Nationalist Congress Party who defeated Vilasrao Kharat (54,554 votes) of the Bhartiya Janata Party.

Members of the Legislative Assembly

See also
 2014 Maharashtra Legislative Assembly election

References

Assembly constituencies of Maharashtra
Assembly constituencies of Jalna district